Dan-Erland Swanö (born 10 March 1973), also known as Dan "The Man" Swanö, is a Swedish musician and record producer who is currently the vocalist, guitarist, ex-bassist and ex-drummer for the band Nightingale, lately vocalist, keyboardist and drummer for the band Witherscape, as well as the owner of Unisound, but he achieved fame as the vocalist and songwriter of progressive death metal band Edge of Sanity.

As a multi-instrumentalist he is regarded as influential in the underground melodic death metal, black metal, progressive metal, death metal, progressive rock, and power metal communities. He is known for his progressive rock-influenced songwriting style and his frequent use of both clean and growled vocals.

Career
Swanö has fronted a number of bands, including Edge of Sanity, Brejn Dedd, Unicorn, Infestdead and Route Nine. He has also been a member of Katatonia and Ribspreader, as well as playing drums and lead guitar in death metal band Bloodbath.

Swanö also participated in Steel, a one-off power metal project from Sweden that featured him and members of Opeth. Started in 1996, this collaboration emerged during the recording sessions for Opeth's Morningrise album. During a jam session, when the band were soundchecking the drums, they hit upon an idea to record a short piece for fun, entitled "Guitars and Metal". This gave birth to Steel. Subsequently, they were asked to record more songs, and when they did, the songs which were originally meant for a demo, actually appeared on a limited picture 7-inch EP titled Heavy Metal Machine, released by Near Dark Productions. To this date, it remains their sole record. Featuring only two songs, Heavy Metal Machine sounds very much like a typical 1980s power metal band, with high-pitched vocals, shredding solos, pounding bass lines and 1980s-style sound effects (police sirens, etc.). However, the record is not meant to be taken as a serious power metal attempt, explaining Swanö's extremely high-pitched vocals. As a limited release, Heavy Metal Machine remains a collectors' item and is hard to come by.

He has also contributed his vocal talents to Arjen Lucassen's Star One project. The two musicians are good friends, with Lucassen contributing guitar parts to Swanö's Nightingale project. Swanö can also be heard on the albums Theli and A'arab Zaraq – Lucid Dreaming by the symphonic metal band Therion. He was a producer and contributing writer of the band Diabolical Masquerade, the now-defunct solo avant-garde black metal band of Anders Nyström a.k.a. Blakkheim (Katatonia, Bloodbath, ex-Bewitched). He also contributed some guitar solos, backing vocals on various Diabolical Masquerade albums, and played the drums on the album Nightwork. He also produced and played the keyboards on the Memories from Nothing album by Swedish rock band Another Life, released on Vic Records.

Swanö has also released a solo progressive death metal album entitled Moontower, on which he plays all instruments (guitar, bass, drums, keyboard) as well as providing all the vocal work.

In July 2007, he auditioned to be lead singer for the Israeli project Amaseffer but lost the part to Mats Levén.

During 2009, Swanö re-activated Odyssey, this time performing all instruments by himself. Swanö recorded seven of his all-time favourite songs which was released in November 2010 on the album Reinventing the Past, together with the three 1999 tracks as a bonus on Vic Records. His brother Dag played guest lead guitar on the song "Gypsy", a Uriah Heep cover.

In 2013, Swanö released with his new project Witherscape the full studio album The Inheritance, with Ragnar Widerberg as co-member, and the collaboration of, amongst other guest musicians, Novembers Doom's founder Paul Kuhr. It was followed a year after by the EP The New Tomorrow. In 2016, the full studio album The Northern Sanctuary was released, via Century Media Records like its predecessors, featuring once again Paul Kuhr.

Swanö has a diverse vocal register, encompassing many styles, which include death growls; clean, melodic singing with a warm tone; dark gothic vocals; and thrash shouting.
As a peculiarity, he is a left-handed guitarist, but plays on right-handed guitars without reversing the strings.

In December 2020 Swanö was a guest on episode 8 of the podcast "Wir und ELANE", hosted by members of the German band Elane. He spoke about several band experiences, the creation process of the first Nightingale album and the project which was called "Second Sky".

Unisound Studio
Unisound Studio (also Unisound Recordings or Gorysound Studio) is a recording studio owned and operated by Dan Swanö. It used to be in Finspång, Sweden, but was closed down in around 2001 because of his family. The studio was later relocated into Swanö's home in Örebro.

Family and work

Despite the large amount of releases to his name, Swanö up until recently worked full-time in a music store (Musikbörsen) in Örebro, near his home in Sweden, rarely doing live performances with any of his bands. He has an older brother, Dag, who plays guitars and keyboards in Nightingale, formerly under the name of "Tom Nouga".

Musical contributions

Discography

Miscellaneous 
 Laodicea
 Manfred Villes
 Necrony – guest vocals, guitars, compositions (under the alias "Day Disyraah")
 Second Sky
 Schecht + Akerfeldt + Swanö '98
 The Lucky Seven
 The Project Hate MCMXCIX – producer on Cybersonic Superchrist. Mixing and Mastering on Deadmarch: Initiation of Blasphemy, Armageddon March Eternal – Symphonies of Slit Wrists, In Hora Mortis Nostræ, and The Lustrate Process
 Ulan Bator

References

External links
 Official Dan Swanö website
 Unisound
 Official Odyssey MySpace page
 Interview with Swanö

1973 births
Living people
Progressive metal guitarists
Swedish heavy metal bass guitarists
Swedish heavy metal drummers
Swedish heavy metal guitarists
Swedish heavy metal singers
Swedish multi-instrumentalists
Death metal musicians
Bloodbath members
Steel (band) members
Star One (band) members
21st-century drummers
21st-century bass guitarists
Black Mark Production artists